The 2008 United States Olympic trials for track and field were held at Hayward Field in Eugene, Oregon. Organised by USA Track and Field, the ten-day competition lasted from June 27 until July 8 and served as the  national championships in track and field for the United States.

The results of the event determined qualification for the American Olympic team at the 2008 Summer Olympics, held in Beijing. Provided they had achieved the Olympic "A" standard, the top three athletes gained a place on the Olympic team. In the event that a leading athlete did not hold an "A" standard, or an athlete withdrew, the next highest finishing athlete with an "A" standard was selected instead.

The trials for the men's marathon were held November 3, 2007 in New York City, the women's marathon were held April 20 in Boston and the trials for the men's 50 km race walk were held February 9 in Miami, Florida.

Medal summary
Key:
.

Men

Men track events

Men field events

Notes
 As a result of Bobby Smith and Brian Chaput not having the "A" standard of 77.00 m, fifth-placed Leigh Smith and Breaux Greer who was eliminated in the preliminary round were included.

Women

Women track events

Women field events

Notes
 As neither Dana Pounds or Rachel Yurkovich met the "A" standard of 60.50 m, fourth-placed Kim Kreiner was included.

References

External links
Official Results webpage at USATF
Official Tracktown webpage

USA Outdoor Track and Field Championships
US Olympic Trials
Track, Outdoor
United States Summer Olympics Trials
Track and field in Oregon
2008 in sports in Oregon